Aluko is a surname. Notable people with the surname include:

Eniola Aluko, English-born Nigerian footballer, sister of Sone 
Gbenga Aluko, Nigerian senator
Sone Aluko, English-born Nigerian footballer, brother of Eniola 
Sope Aluko, Nigerian-born British American actress
T. M. Aluko, Nigerian writer

See also